Khare is a Hindu family surname found in India among Kayastha, and takes its meaning from the word 'pure'.

Notable people
 Adonna Jantina Khare (born 1980), American artist

Aishwarya Khare (born 1995), Indian television actress

Amit Khare (born 1961), Indian Administrative Service officer

Ananya Khare (born 1968), Indian television and film actress

Atul Khare (born 1959), Under-Secretary General for Operational Support UN Department of Operational Support

 Bishun Narain Khare (1933-2013), scientist who specialized in the chemistry of planetary atmospheres and of molecules relevant to biology

Chandrashekhar Khare (born 1968), professor of mathematics at the University of California Los Angeles

Harish Khare, Indian journalist 

Michelle Khare (born 1992), American YouTuber, television host, actress and a former professional cyclist

Nanda Khare (1946-2022), Indian writer and civil engineer

Narayan Bhaskar Khare (1884-1970), Indian politician and Chief Minister of Central Province (present day Madhya Pradesh)

R. S. Khare (born 1936), socio-cultural anthropologist and a Professor of Anthropology at the University of Virginia

Rohit Khare,  Indian American computer scientist and entrepreneur

Sandeep Khare (born 1973), Marathi poet, performing artist, actor and singer-songwriter

Sonali Khare (born 1982), Indian Marathi film and television actress

Vishnu Khare (1940-2018), Indian Hindi poet, translator, literary and film critic, journalist and scriptwriter

 Vishweshwar Nath Khare (born 1939), 33rd Chief Justice of India

References

Further reading
History of Kashmiri Pandits by Jia Lal Kilam
Chandra, Suresh (1998). Encyclopedia of Hindu Gods & Goddesses. Sarup & Sons. p. 376.

Social groups of India
Indian surnames